Eulima angulosa is a species of sea snail, a marine gastropod mollusk in the family Eulimidae. The species is one of a number within the genus Eulima.

Description
The length of the shell attains 11 mm.

Distribution
This marine species occurs off Senegal and Gabon.

References

 Bernard, P.A. (Ed.) (1984). Coquillages du Gabon [Shells of Gabon]. Pierre A. Bernard: Libreville, Gabon. 140, 75 plates pp

External links
 To World Register of Marine Species
 Fischer-Piette E. & Nicklès M. 1946. Mollusques nouveaux ou peu connus des côtes de l´Afrique occidentale. Journal de Conchyliologie 87 (2): 45-82, 1 pl

angulosa
Gastropods described in 1946